The South Australian Football Association was the precursor to the South Australian National Football League.

South Australian Football Association may also refer to:
 South Australian Football Association (1978–95), a semi-professional Australian rules football competition operating from 1978 to 1995.